Madeline is the debut album by Fort Collins band Tickle Me Pink, released on September 4, 2007, under the Wind-up Records label. It has been said that this album focuses on many major issues in today's world, including mortality, drug use, suicide, loss, brutal breakups to name but a few.
Tickle Me Pink singer Sean Kennedy had said: "It is somewhat ironic that many of our songs deal with death and a higher purpose. We want to let the world know how short life is; embrace the ones you love and treasure each moment without regret."

Madeline was recorded in "The Blasting Room" in Fort Collins, which is the band's home town, and was produced by Lee Miles.

On the day Madeline was released, bassist/guitarist Johnny Schou died aged 22.denverpost

The song "The Time Is Wrong" is available as free downloadable content in Rock Band 2.

Reception

AllMusic described the album as generic, stating the band's "dramatic performance doesn't have much substance to back it up."

Track listing

Credits
Tickle Me Pink
Sean Kennedy – Lead vocals, guitar
Johnny Schou – Bass guitar, backing vocals
Stefan Runstrom – Drums, percussion

Artwork
Scott Kennedy – Design, Layout Design

Production
Lee Miles – Producer
Andrew Berlin – Producer, engineer, mixing
Jason Livermore – Mastering

Charts

References

2007 debut albums
Tickle Me Pink albums
Wind-up Records albums